Southern Bastards is an comic book series created in 2014 by Jason Aaron and Jason Latour, and published by Image Comics. The series revolves around the culture in a small town in the American South where football is everything and people try to get away with crime. The series won the 2015 Harvey Award for Best New Series and the 2016 Eisner Award for Best Continuing Series.

Publication history
Two Southerners, writer Jason Aaron from Alabama and writer-artist Jason Latour from North Carolina, wanted to write a love letter/hate rant to the South so they created the Southern-focused series.

Story
Craw County, Alabama is home of Boss BBQ and the state football champion Runnin’ Rebs; most residents adore high school football. Coach Euless Boss is the high school football coach with no more room in his office for trophies and is a crime lord that buries bodies underneath the bleachers. The former sheriff's son Earl Tubb is an angry man that has grievances with Coach Boss over how his father died.

Coach Boss holds power over Craw County for one reason – he wins football games. But, after the ugliest loss of his career, the coach must become more of a criminal to keep ahead of his enemies, including new enemies like Roberta Tubb, who's come to town with a machine gun and her own questions about how her father died.

Reception
Southern Bastards has received generally positive reviews. The review aggregation website Comic Book Roundup reports that the series has an average score of 9.0 out of 10.

The series is the 2015 Harvey Award winner for Best New Series) and the 2016 Eisner Award winner for Best Continuing Series.

The series paused in 2020 when Latour took a leave of absence in light of misconduct allegations.

Awards
Southern Bastards won Best Continuing Series at the 2016 Eisner Awards.

Issues

Collected editions

Trade paperbacks

Premiere hardcovers

References

External links

Official website

Image Comics titles
2014 comics debuts
Comics by Jason Aaron
American football comics